Biggs Ford Site is an archaeological site near Frederick in Frederick County, Maryland. It is one of the few known, large late prehistoric Native American village sites near the Monocacy River. The site dates from the Middle to Late Woodland period.

It was listed on the National Register of Historic Places in 1975.

References

External links
, including photo in 1970, at Maryland Historical Trust

Archaeological sites in Frederick County, Maryland
Archaeological sites on the National Register of Historic Places in Maryland
Native American history of Maryland
Late Woodland period
Middle Woodland period
National Register of Historic Places in Frederick County, Maryland